Nefzaoua (نفزاوة) is a region of south-west Tunisia, bounded by Chott el Jerid to the west, the Grand Erg Oriental to the south and the Dahar plateau to the east.

Administratively, the territory is in the Kebili Governorate and covers 2.208 million hectares, including 15,300 hectares of oasis. Historically the region attracted missionaries.

References

Geography of Tunisia